Taymor Travon McIntyre (born June 16, 2000), known professionally as Tay-K is an American rapper and convicted murderer. He is best known for his 2017 hit song "The Race", which peaked number 44 on the US Billboard Hot 100 and was certified platinum by the RIAA in January 2018. The lyrics detail criminal activity conducted by McIntyre, and became popular following a nationwide manhunt for his eventual arrest in Elizabeth, New Jersey.

McIntyre was captured by U.S. marshals on June 30, 2017, the same day "The Race" was released, after a total of three months from evading authorities. The song would later hit platinum. After being brought back to Texas for his crimes, McIntyre started to receive support from his fans on social media. While being held at Tarrant County Jail in Fort Worth, Texas, Tay-K's management team released his debut mixtape, Santana World, on July 29, 2017, and it received a generally positive response from critics and fans.

In July 2019, McIntyre was found guilty of murder for his involvement in the 2016 home invasion and robbery that left 21-year-old Ethan Walker dead, and was sentenced to 55 years in prison. In November 2019, McIntyre was indicted on a second murder charge for allegedly shooting 23-year-old Mark Anthony Saldivar, an offense for which he is awaiting trial.

Early life
His father, Kevin Beverly, was imprisoned during McIntyre's youth. McIntyre's mother moved him and his sister to Las Vegas, Nevada, when he was eight years old. When McIntyre's father was released from prison, he moved the family to Arlington, Texas, in search of a better environment. McIntyre attended Martin High School, but dropped out in the 9th grade. He is influenced by Chief Keef, XXXTentacion, Eazy-E, Young Pappy, and his favorite rapper Soulja Boy.

Career
McIntyre started his rap career as part of the rap group Daytona Boyz alongside rappers Pimpyz and Santana Sage in 2014.  The group released their first track "Drift" on audio distribution platform SoundCloud on December 25, 2014. The group released a series of songs, barely getting attention as they performed at various parties attempting to create a presence in the local rap scene.

McIntyre released his first solo song in August 2015 titled "BIFF XANNEN" on his SoundCloud account. This and his September 2015 song "Sly Cooper" garnered local attention within the Arlington rap scene. McIntyre's song "Megaman" was released on his SoundCloud on March 16, 2016, and, along with several other songs McIntyre released, became popular after he was arrested on capital murder charges.

McIntyre released several songs while on the run from the police, including "The Race" which was recorded during McIntyre's stay in New Jersey and the music video was released on YouTube the same day as his capture. The song debuted at number 70 on the US Billboard Hot 100 after a large hashtag campaign pursuing the release of McIntyre using the hashtag "#FREETAYK". It peaked at 44 on the Billboard Hot 100 and has over 226 million views on YouTube. "The Race" has been remixed by numerous artists including Tyga, Lil Yachty,  YBN Nahmir,   Fetty Wap, and Rico Nasty among others.

While incarcerated, McIntyre released the mixtape Santana World. WorldStarHipHop released "Coolin" on September 14, 2017. McIntyre's official Twitter account tweeted that the version released by WorldStarHipHop was a leak and not official saying "we have something major in store."

On December 14, 2017, McIntyre's debut mixtape Santana World was re-released by 88 Classic and RCA Records, which was updated with a remix of his single "The Race" featuring vocals from rappers 21 Savage and Young Nudy. "The Race" was certified platinum by the RIAA on January 19, 2018. On February 2, 2018, McIntyre's official Twitter account tweeted two pictures of McIntyre, the first time he had been seen since May 2017. The following day, the song "After You" was released on McIntyre's SoundCloud account.

It was revealed in March 2018 that McIntyre had earned around $600,000 to $700,000 with his record deal with 88 Classic and RCA Records. Following the creation of the No Jumper music label, Tay-K was featured alongside BlocBoy JB on No Jumper's song "Hard" which entered the Bubbling Under Hot 100 charts at number 14. Tay-K was featured on the shortlist for the 2018 XXL Freshman list.

Criminal history

January 2016: Bystander to a fatal shooting 
McIntyre first came close to legal trouble on January 1, 2016. After performing at a New Year's Eve celebration in Denton, Texas, McIntyre was in a car with U.S. Marine and fellow Daytona Boyz member Eric "Santana Sage" Johnson, who shot University of North Texas student Sara Mutschlechner in the head, killing her, following an argument between occupants of the car carrying Johnson and McIntyre and occupants of another car carrying people leaving the same party, including Mutschlechner. Witnesses stated that passengers in the car carrying Johnson and McIntyre sexually accosted Mutschlechner, while Johnson stated that passengers riding with Mutschechner called him and his fellow passengers racial and homophobic slurs, and that he had only intended to scare the passengers in the other car off after receiving threats of bodily harm. Johnson pleaded not guilty but was convicted of the murder and sentenced to 44 years in prison. McIntyre was not charged in the case.

July 2016–2019: Mansfield burglary and capital murder 
In July 2016, McIntyre faced his first major legal issues when he and six other people were arrested on capital murder charges related to a home invasion which ended the life of a drug dealer in Mansfield, Texas. On July 26, 2016, Megan Holt, 19, and Ariana Bharrat, 20, conspired with McIntyre and some other friends to rob nineteen-year-old Zachary Beloate. The pair planned to seduce him and then let McIntyre enter the house, armed with guns, to steal drugs and money. One of the two women unlocked the door and the gunmen proceeded to rob Beloate and his friend Ethan Walker, which led to a fatal confrontation and the death of Walker as they were attempting to leave; two other non-fatal gunshot wounds were sustained. McIntyre admitted his role in the botched robbery in an approximate two-and-a-half-hour interrogation, telling detectives that he searched for drugs in the house.

McIntyre was transferred to an adult jail on July 20, 2017. A preliminary certification hearing to decide McIntyre's status as a juvenile was held on August 30, 2017. Trent Loftin, a lawyer for McIntyre, said to The New York Times that McIntyre was optimistic and that they were confident he would be cleared of all charges. It was decided that McIntyre would be tried as an adult in the case. The trial was eventually pushed back due to lack of evidence.

On February 28, 2018, one of McIntyre's accomplices, an unnamed minor described as a "petite, pretty blonde" was sentenced to twenty years in prison after being found guilty on capital murder and aggravated robbery charges. In February 2018, accomplice Megan Holt pleaded guilty to aggravated robbery and agreed to testify against her co-defendants in exchange for a 20-year sentence. In May 2018, Latharian Merritt was sentenced to life in prison without parole after being convicted of capital murder. In August 2018, Ariana Bharrat pleaded guilty to aggravated robbery and agreed to testify against her co-defendants in exchange for a 25-year sentence. In that same month, Sean Robinson pleaded guilty to murder and was sentenced to 40 years in prison. In November 2018, McIntyre's last accomplice, Jalen Bell, pleaded guilty to aggravated robbery charges and was sentenced to 30 years in prison. McIntyre's defense attorneys argued that because McIntyre's case had started in the juvenile system — which does not have a bail or bond system in place — he was now entitled to one under Texas law (as of March 2018). State District Judge Wayne Salvant denied McIntyre's request for bond, expressing concern that McIntyre's alleged crimes had been "glorified" and that he was a "high, violent assessment".

On May 24, 2018, it was confirmed McIntyre was not facing the death penalty or life imprisonment without the possibility of parole under Miller v. Alabama and Roper v. Simmons. If convicted, he faces 40 years to life in prison with the possibility of parole.

On July 15, 2019, on the first day of his trial, McIntyre pleaded guilty to two counts of aggravated robbery in the Mansfield home invasion case. On July 19, 2019, a jury found McIntyre guilty of capital murder and a third count of aggravated robbery. He faced up to ninety-nine years in prison. His single, "The Race", which was written while he was on the run from the U.S. Marshals Service, was introduced as evidence during the sentencing phase of the trial. On July 23, 2019, he was given the maximum ninety-nine year prison sentence (fifty-five years for capital murder, thirty years for one count of aggravated robbery, and twenty-six years prison for the remaining two counts of aggravated robbery). The four prison terms will be served concurrently, and he will be eligible for parole after serving twenty-eight years. He was also fined $21,000 ($10,000 for the murder charge and $11,000 combined for three counts of aggravated robbery).

January–June 2017: House arrest, manhunt and "The Race" 
McIntyre was placed under house arrest in January 2017 while awaiting certification hearings. A few days before said hearings were held, on March 27, 2017, McIntyre and another suspect cut off their ankle monitors and fled to San Antonio, Texas. Just before cutting his ankle monitor off and going on the run, McIntyre wrote the following on Twitter: "fuck dis house arrest shit fuck 12 they gn hav 2 catch me on hood". McIntyre made his way to Elizabeth, New Jersey where he recorded the song "The Race", which described his run from the police and his legal troubles. The song opens with "Fuck a beat, I was tryna beat a case/but I ain't beat that case, bitch I did the race". The suspect that McIntyre fled with was captured in May 2017. On June 30, 2017, McIntyre was captured by the U.S Marshal Service in Elizabeth, New Jersey. When McIntyre was captured, in order to avoid custody, he claimed to have swallowed a bottle of pills and was taken to a hospital. When nothing was found wrong with McIntyre, he claimed that he was hearing voices, and was then taken to a psychiatric ward for evaluation, where he was kept for a day and a half before being taken into custody.

April–May 2017: San Antonio shooting and Arlington mugging 
While on the run from his then-ongoing capital murder trial, on April 23, 2017, McIntyre allegedly shot and killed twenty-three year-old Mark Anthony Saldivar while participating in a robbery outside of a Chick-fil-A in San Antonio, Texas. According to the allegations, McIntyre and two accomplices lured Saldivar into a black SUV to try to steal his photography equipment. Saldivar escaped the SUV and started to shout for help, McIntyre accelerated in an attempt to hit him. Saldivar jumped onto the hood of the SUV, kicking the windscreen until McIntyre allegedly left the car and shot him once before driving away. A month later, on May 25, McIntyre allegedly attacked and robbed sixty-five year-old Owney "Skip" Pepe in Cravens Park, Arlington, Texas. McIntyre allegedly held a gun to Pepe's head before knocking him unconscious in the park, where Pepe was later found by a jogger. Pepe later identified McIntyre during a photo lineup.

On October 3, 2017, additional capital murder charges were added to McIntyre's case involving the incident in San Antonio. Police claim that McIntyre was in the vehicle during the shooting and that there is surveillance footage of the incident. At the time, McIntyre was held on $500,000 bail though in February 2018, the bail was set to $0, but was legally ineligible to make a conditional release while on trial.

In August 2019, less than two weeks after his sentencing for the Mansfield home invasion and murder, McIntyre was extradited to the Bexar County Jail to awaiting trial for the Mark Saldivar murder case. In November 2019, a Bexar County grand jury indicted him for capital murder.

Other criminal activies 
While in jail on August 2, 2018, McIntyre was charged with possession of a prohibited item after a mobile phone was found hidden in his sock during a search. McIntyre was moved from Tarrant County Jail to maximum-security Lon Evans Corrections Center on August 14, where he spent 23 hours in solitary confinement with one hour allotted to go to the gym. During his time in Tarrant County Jail, he allegedly shouted profanities and made death threats toward a Tarrant County Sheriff sergeant, threw his food tray and wet toilet paper, and went over his allotted phone time. Two days later, McIntyre won a legal battle on August 16, when the Texas' Second Court of Appeals ruled that State District Judge Wayne Salvant made a mistake in refusing to set bail for McIntyre concerning his aggravated robbery case. However, he was still denied bail for the case involving the murder of Ethan Walker.

Lawsuits 
McIntyre has been involved in two lawsuits as a result of his alleged participation in the murders of Mark Saldivar, Ethan Walker, and the attempted murder of Zachary Beloate. In June 2018, Saldivar's family, the victim of the San Antonio shooting, filed a wrongful death lawsuit seeking more than $1 million in damages. A month later, Walker's family and survivor Zachary Beloate jointly sued McIntyre and his former record labels, 88 Classic and RCA Records, for the profits of his music following Walker's death and Beloate's injuries.

Discography

Mixtape

Extended play

Singles

As lead artist

As featured artist

References 

21st-century American criminals
American male rappers
American robbers
Living people
Crips
People from Arlington, Texas
21st-century American rappers
21st-century American male musicians
American child musicians
Prisoners and detainees of Texas
Rappers from Texas
People convicted of murder by Texas
Mumble rappers
2000 births